The Forester Sisters is the debut studio album by the American country music group of the same name. It was released in 1985 (see 1985 in country music) on Warner Bros. Records. The lead-off single, "(That's What You Do) When You're in Love", peaked at No. 10 on the Billboard country chart. It was followed by three consecutive number-one hits: "I Fell in Love Again Last Night", "Just in Case", and "Mama's Never Seen Those Eyes".

Track listing

Personnel

The Forester Sisters 
 Christy Forester – vocals 
 June Forester – vocals
 Kathy Forester – vocals
 Kim Forester – vocals

Musicians 
 Steve Nathan – keyboards
 J.L. Wallace – keyboards, acoustic guitar, electric guitars
 Ken Bell – acoustic guitar, electric guitars
 Will McFarlane – acoustic guitar 
 John Willis – acoustic guitar
 Sonny Garrish – steel guitar
 Hoot Hester – fiddle, mandolin
 Lonnie "Butch" Ledford – bass guitar
 Owen Hale – drums

Production 
 Terry Skinner – producer 
 J.L. Wallace – producer 
 Steve Melton – recording, mixing 
 Alan Schulman – recording 
 George Clinton – recording assistant 
 Paul Mann – recording assistant 
 Steve Moore – recording assistant 
 Jerell Sockwell – mix assistant 
 Glenn Meadows – mastering at Masterfonics (Nashville, Tennessee)
 Paige Rowden – production coordinator 
 Gabrielle Raumberger – art direction, design 
 Alan Messer – photography

Chart performance

References

1985 debut albums
The Forester Sisters albums
Warner Records albums